Chain Letters is the second album from North Carolina hip hop artist Supastition. "Hate My Face" was released as a single but did not chart.

Track listing
 "Chain Letters (Intro)" – 3:30 (Ibanga, Moye)
 "Don't Stop" – 4:17 (Landon, Moye)
 "Split Decisions" – 4:25 (Landon, Moye)
 "Soul Control" – 3:26 (Coleman, Ibanga, Jones, Moye)
 (featuring Phonte, Big Pooh)
 "Rise" – 3:56 (Moye, Rook)
 "That Ain't Me" – 5:05 (Ibanga, Moye)
 "Hate My Face" – 4:01 (Dutton, Moye)
 "Special Treatment" – 3:46 (Ibanga, Moye)
 "Ain't Goin' Out (Like That)" – 2:30 (Ibanga, Moye)
 "A Baby Story" –  4:24 (Moye, Rigmaiden, Rook)
 (featuring Noñameko)
 "100%" – 4:07 (Ibanga, Moye)
 "Yesterday Everyday" – 5:26 (D, Moye, Rook, Young)
 (featuring D Minor)
 "Nickeled Needles" – 4:40 (Landon, Moye)
 "Appreciation" – 4:13 (McKiever, Moye)
 "Blood Brothers" –  4:40 (Clinton, Ibanga, Moye)
 (featuring Seven)
 "Always" – 3:54 (Eusebio, Landon, Moye)
 (featuring Can'Tell)
 "Soul Control" (solo version), "Boondocks Studio" (skit), "Yall-Mart" (skit) – 5:55 (Ibanga, Moye)

Production
 Illmind (track 1, 4, 6, 8, 9, 11, 15, 17)
 M-Phazes (track 2, 3, 13, 16)
 Nicolay (track 5, 10, 12)
 Jake One (track 7)
 Madwreck (track 14)

2005 albums
Supastition albums
Albums produced by Illmind
Albums produced by Jake One
Albums produced by Nicolay (musician)